USS LST-17 was a United States Navy  used in the European Theater of Operations and Asiatic-Pacific Theater during World War II and manned by a United States Coast Guard crew. Like many of her class, she was not named and is properly referred to by her hull designation.

Construction
LST-17 was laid down on 21 September 1942, at Pittsburgh, Pennsylvania, by the Dravo Corporation; launched on 8 January 1943; sponsored by Mrs. Sarah H. Bankson; and commissioned on 19 April 1943.

Service history

1943 convoy duty
She was first assigned to the Europe-Africa-Middle East Theater. Departing Little Creek, Virginia, on 27 July 1943, LST-17 headed for Oran, Algeria, arriving there on 14 August 1943. She sailed with Convoy KMS 23 during part of its journey from Gibraltar, to Port Said, Egypt, sailing from Oran, to Bizerta, Tunisia. LST-17 sailed from Algiers, Algeria, to Port Said, Egypt, in October 1943, this time joining with Convoy UGS 19. On 3 November, she set out with nine other LSTs from Aden, Yemen, for Bombay, India, arriving on 10 November. She left the next day for Colombo, British Ceylon, arriving on 16 November. At the end of December she left Calcutta, with 11 LSTs headed for Colombo, British Ceylon, arriving 27 December 1943.

1944 convoy duty/Normandy invasion

LST-17 joined Convoy MKS 38 at Bizerta, in January 1944, as it was en route to Gibraltar, arriving 1 February. Forming Convoy MKS 38G she rendezvoused with Convoy SL 147 and sailed for Liverpool on 2 February, arriving on 13 February 1944.

LST-17 arrived at Milford Haven, Wales, on 3 March 1944. Leaving Milford Haven on 3 March 1944, she proceeded to Portland and returned to Milford Haven on 15 March 1944. On 31 March, she left for Lough Foyle and then visited in turn Derry, Roseneath (sic), Plymouth, Senny Cliff Bay, Weymouth, Solent and Southampton, returning to Solent, on 28 May 1944, to prepare for the Normandy invasion, towing Rhino barges on which were railway equipment for use in France.

She sailed to the sea off Normandy, detaching the Rhino barges to the beach at 16:15 on 6 June 1944. At 20:10 she received the first group of casualties via DUKWs and returned to Solent, on 7 June. On 15 June, she left Southampton and anchored off France. The following day she beached at "JIG GREEN" on the "Gold" assault areas at 11:08 with British and Canadian troops. She left the beach on 17 June, and returned to Tilbury, England, proceeding to Solent, on 20 June. She left Solent on 23 June 1944, and beached at Normandy, France, at 16:39 that day, returning to Solent, on 24 June. Again on 27 June, she left Solent and beached in Normandy, France, at 18:48, leaving Normandy, on 28 June, and arriving at Tilbury, on 29 June. She departed Southend on 30 June, arriving at Seine Bay, France, on 1 July 1944, with Convoy ETM 22.

LST-17 sailed for London, on 4 July. Her next trip was on 14 July 1944, when she left Thames Dry Dock and arrived at Normandy, on the same day, returning to Southampton on 16 July. Again on 18 July, she left Southampton, this time for Utah Beach, Normandy, France, leaving there on 19 July, and arriving at Weymouth, England on 20 July. She left Weymouth on 21 July, and arrived at Omaha Beach that same day and returned to Portland. From this time until September 1944, she made continuous trips between Utah Beach and England. Arriving at Cornwall, on 17 September 1944, she departed for Norfolk, Virginia, on 5 October 1944, and taking on fuel and provisions at Norfolk, on 24 October, she arrived at Boston, on 26 October 1944, for overhaul.

On 10 November 1944, her Coast Guard crew was "relieved of manning" LST-17.

1945 convoy duty
LST-17 left from New York City, on 26 January 1945, as part of Convoy NG 486 bound for Guantánamo, Cuba, where she arrived on 2 February. She then left the next day as part of Convoy GZ 119 en route to the Panama Canal Zone and Cristóbal, Colón, where she arrived on 6 February.

Post war
Following the war, LST-17 performed occupation duty in the Far East intermittently from September through December 1945. She was decommissioned on 15 January 1946 and turned over to Commander Naval Forces Far East being redesignated Q015.

She was laid up as part of the Pacific Reserve Fleet before being transferred to the 13th Naval District for use as a mobile target where she was sunk by a torpedo on 15 August 1956.

Awards
LST-17 earned one battle stars for her World War II service.

References

Bibliography

External links

 

LST-1-class tank landing ships of the United States Navy
World War II amphibious warfare vessels of the United States
Ships built in Pittsburgh
1943 ships
United States Navy ships crewed by the United States Coast Guard
Ships built by Dravo Corporation